Myra Turley is an American film and television actress, best known as Dale in the 1995 sitcom
Muscle, and as Madeline Evelley in Clint Eastwood's Flags of Our Fathers.

Her other appearances include supporting roles in episodes of such television series as Dallas, LA Law, Murphy Brown, ER, NYPD Blue, Party of Five, Seinfeld, Friends, That '70s Show, Scrubs and Desperate Housewives. She played Katherine Olson, Peggy Olson's mother, in Mad Men.

Filmography

Film

Television

References

External links

Living people
American film actresses
American television actresses
College of New Rochelle alumni
Year of birth missing (living people)
Place of birth missing (living people)
21st-century American women